Köthel is a village in Schleswig-Holstein, Germany. It is divided by the Bille river into two parts which are located in different Landkreis:

 Köthel, Lauenburg
 Köthel (Stormarn)